Elizabeth Beauchamp, Baroness (A)Bergavenny (16 September 1415 – 18 June 1448) was a medieval English noblewoman and heiress. She was the only child of Richard de Beauchamp, Baron Abergavenny and Earl of Worcester, by Isabel, daughter of Thomas le Despenser, Earl of Gloucester by Constance of York, granddaughter of Edward III.

She inherited her father's estates upon his death in 1422, and succeeded to the title of Lady Bergavenny [E., 1392] on 18 March 1422, suo jure. She became the first wife of Edward Neville, 3rd Baron Bergavenny (d. 1476) before 18 October 1424. He was a younger son of Ralph de Neville, 1st Earl of Westmorland and Joan Beaufort, Countess of Westmorland, daughter of John of Gaunt and his third wife, Katherine Roët, aka Katherine Swynford. Her husband's brother, George Neville, 1st Baron Latimer, married her step-sister, also named Elizabeth Beauchamp, daughter of her step-father Richard Beauchamp, 13th Earl of Warwick. Their half-brother and half-sister married their husbands' niece and nephew.

Elizabeth and Edward had several children including George Nevill, 4th Baron Bergavenny. She was buried in Coventry in the graveyard of the Carmelites.

Ancestry

References

1415 births
1448 deaths
15th-century English women
15th-century English people
Elizabeth
English baronesses
Daughters of British earls
People from Worcestershire
Place of death missing
Barons Bergavenny (Peerage of England)